Alpine Pearls is a cooperation established in 2006, consisting of 23 municipalities in five alpine countries. The tourism association claims to support and promote active mobility. The cooperation’s members fulfill strict quality criteria like town centers with reduced traffic, transfer services, environmentally friendly leisure time facilities, the guarantee of mobility without car and ecological minimum standards.

Development of Alpine Pearls 
Alpine Pearls is the result of two successive EU projects (Alps Mobility and Alps Mobility II – Alpine Pearls). The cooperation emphasises the importance of sustainable tourism, combining tourist attractions with environmentally friendly active mobility.

Member Municipalities

Germany 
 Bad Reichenhall
 Berchtesgaden

Italy 
 Ceresole Reale
 Cogne
 Chamois - La Magdeleine
 Forni di Sopra
 Moena
 Moos in Passeier
 Mals
 Ratschings
 Villnöß
 Limone Piemonte

Austria 
 Hinterstoder
 Mallnitz
 Neukirchen am Großvenediger
 Weissensee
 Werfenweng

Switzerland 
 Arosa
 Interlaken
 Disentis / Mustér
 Les Diablerets

Slovenia 
 Bled
 Bohinj

External links 
 Alpine Pearls Homepage

Ecotourism
Tourism in Europe
Local government organizations
Tourism agencies
Municipal international relations
Alps